X Factor is an Albanian television music competition to find new singing talents. The second season began on 28 October 2012 on TV Klan.

Based on the UK format, the competition consists of auditions, in front of producers and then the judges with a live audience; bootcamp; judges' houses and then the live finals. Auditions for the show began in August and concluded in September 2011. The show is hosted by Albanian singer Alketa Vejsiu, while the judging panel consists of the biggest Albanian artists. Albanian famous writer, composer and TV presenter Pandi Laço, Albanian Macedonian pop singer Altuna Sejdiu, Soni Malaj and the Albanian superstar Alban Skënderaj. The season was won by Arilena Ara of the Girls category.

Judges
This year, Juliana Pasha and Vesa Luma were replaced by the new judges, Altuna Sejdiu and Soni Malaj. The reason that Pasha and Luma did not continue their mentoring job, was generally due to their music commitment. Altuna Sejdiu, the new judge, was a part of last year's X Factor auditions in Tirana, replacing Vesa Luma. After the withdrawal of Pasha and Luma, it was rumoured that Altuna Sejdiu will be a part of the show. Together with her, Kosovo-based Albanian singer, Eliza Hoxha was also rumoured to be a judge. However, a few days before the show aired, TV Klan held a press conference explaining the procedure and the new judges. Bojken Lako was also a guest-judge in the auditions.

Judges' houses

The 13 eliminated acts were:
Boys: Amadeo Gjura, Bekim Elezi, Enur Pakashtica, Xhustino Hasani
Girls: Daniela Kola, Ersona Cakaj, Sanja Fajkoja, Silvana Rusi
Over 23s: Arta Selimi, Francesko Methoxha
Groups: Crazy Mix, Rapsodi, The Extrems

After the judges' houses stage, Arilena Ara and Kanita Suma were put into the live shows as wildcards.

Contestants
The top 18 contestants were confirmed as follows;

Key:
 – Winner
 – Runner-up
 – Third Place

Live shows

Results summary 

Color key

Live show details

Week 1 (16 December 2012) 

Judges' votes to eliminate
Alban Skenderaj: Ina Torba
Pandi Laço: Foxy Ladies
Altuna Sejdiu: Ina Torba
Soni Malaj: Ina Torba

Week 2 (23 December 2012) 

Judges' votes to eliminate
Pandi Laço: Foxy Ladies
Alban Skënderaj: Shkelqesa Sadiku
Altuna Sejdiu: Foxy Ladies
Soni Malaj: Foxy Ladies

Week 3 (1 January 2013)

Week 4 (6 January 2013) 

Judges' votes to eliminate
Altuna Sejdiu: Shkelqesa Sadiku
Soni Malaj: Shkelqesa Sadiku
Pandi Laço: Shkelqesa Sadiku
Alban Skenderaj: It was not necessary to vote for Shkelqesa already had the votes necessary for elimination.

Week 5 (13 January 2013) 

Judges' votes to eliminate
Soni Malaj: Suela Malasi
Pandi Laço: Herri Beluli
Alban Skenderaj: Suela Malasi
Altuna Sejdiu: Suela Malasi

Week 6 (20 January 2013) 

Judges' votes to eliminate
Pandi Laço: Herri Beluli
Altuna Sejdiu: Sardi Strugaj
Alban Skenderaj: Herri Beluli
Soni Malaj: Sardi Strugaj

Week 7 (27 January 2013) 

Judges' votes to eliminate
Alban Skenderaj: Xhina Kelmendi
Altuna Sejdiu: Soul Sisters
Soni Malaj: Xhina Kelmendi
Pandi Laço: Soul Sisters

Week 8 (3 February 2013) 

Judges' votes to eliminate
Soni Malaj: Elisa Salla
Altuna Sejdiu: Petro Xhori
Alban Skenderaj: Elisa Salla
Pandi Laço: Elisa Salla

Week 9 (10 February 2013) 

Judges' votes to eliminate
Soni Malaj: Antonela Çekixhi
Altuna Sejdiu: Petro Xhori
Pandi Laço: Petro Xhori
Alban Skenderaj: Petro Xhori

Week 10 (17 February 2013) 

Judges' votes to eliminate
Alban Skenderaj: Soul Sisters
Altuna Sejdiu: Soul Sisters
Soni Malaj: Soul Sisters
Pandi Laço: It was not necessary to vote for Soul Sisters already had the votes necessary for elimination.

Week 11 (24 February 2013) 

Judges' votes to eliminate
Alban Skenderaj: Egzona Ademi
Pandi Laço: KSAL
Altuna Sejdiu: Egzona Ademi
Soni Malaj: KSAL

Week 12 (3 March 2013) 

Judges' votes to eliminate
Altuna Sejdiu: Sardi Strugaj
Soni Malaj: Antonela Çekixhi
Alban Skenderaj: Sardi Strugaj
Pandi Laço: Sardi Strugaj

Week 13 (10 March 2013) 

Judges' votes to eliminate
Soni Malaj: KSAL
Alban Skenderaj: Aldo Bardhi
Pandi Laço: KSAL
Altuna Sejdiu: KSAL

Week 14 (17 March 2013) 

Judges' votes to eliminate
Soni Malaj: Antonela Çekixhi
Alban Skenderaj: Kanita Suma
Pandi Laço: Antonela Çekixhi
Altuna Sejdiu: Kanita Suma

Week 15 (24 March 2013) 

Judges' votes to eliminate
Pandi Laço: Aldo Bardhi 
Soni Malaj: Kanita Suma
Alban Skenderaj: Kanita Suma 
Altuna Sejdiu: Aldo Bardhi

References

X Factor (Albanian TV series)
2012 Albanian television seasons
2013 Albanian television seasons
Albania 02